This is a list of foreign ministers of South Ossetia.

1994–1996: Dmitry Medoyev
1996–1998: Yury Gagloyty
1998–2012: Murat Dzhioyev
2012–2016: David Sanakoyev
2016–2017: Murat Dzhioyev
2017–2022: Dmitry Medoyev
2022–present: Akhsar Dzhioev

Sources
Rulers.org – Foreign ministers E–K

Foreign
Foreign Ministers
Politicians